Mark Braund is the current chief executive RedstoneConnect.

Braund was appointed CEO of InterQuest in 2011 during which time he oversaw a major rebranding of the Group's businesses. Prior to Mark's appointment as CEO of InterQuest he gained over 30 years of experience in the recruitment sector with Manpower and IBM; and as founder of recruitment organisation Barker Personnel Services  before overseeing their sale to the Carlisle Group in 2000.

Braund is a regular contributor for the Huffington Post, Staffing Industry Analysts and the Information Daily,  writing articles covering a broad range of topics including technology, analytics, recruitment and HR. Mark has a keen interest in the subject of analytics, one of the key areas of his company's focus and has had articles on the subject published on several occasions.

References

Living people
English chief executives
Year of birth missing (living people)